The 2023 Vancouver Whitecaps FC season is the club's twelfth season in Major League Soccer, the top division of soccer in the United States and Canada. Including previous iterations of the franchise, this was the 46th season of professional soccer being played in Vancouver under a variation of the "Whitecaps" name.

Having won the 2022 Canadian Championship, the Whitecaps will participate in the CONCACAF Champions League for the first time since the 2016-17 edition and third time overall.

Current roster

Transfers

In

Transferred in

Loans In

Out

Transferred out

Loans out

MLS SuperDraft picks

Preseason

Competition overview

Major League Soccer

Regular season

League tables

Western Conference

Overall

Results

Matches

Canadian Championship

As champions of the 2022 tournament, the Whitecaps received a bye into the quarter-finals.

CONCACAF Champions League

Round of 16

Quarterfinals

Leagues Cup

Group stage

The Vancouver Whitecaps qualified to the Leagues Cup group stage as a wildcard team. They were drawn into West Group 3.

Statistics

Appearances and goals

|-
! colspan="14" style=background:#dcdcdc; text-align:center| Goalkeepers 

|-
! colspan="14" style=background:#dcdcdc; text-align:center| Defenders 

|-
! colspan="14" style=background:#dcdcdc; text-align:center| Midfielders 

 

|-
! colspan="14" style=background:#dcdcdc; text-align:center| Forwards
 

|-
! colspan="14" style=background:#dcdcdc; text-align:center| Players transferred out during the season

Goalscorers

Clean sheets

Disciplinary record

References

2023 Major League Soccer season
2023
Canadian soccer clubs 2023 season